Shobna Gulati  (born 7 August 1966) is an English actress and presenter. Gulati is known for her roles as Anita in dinnerladies, and Sunita Alahan in the soap opera Coronation Street from 2001 to 2013. From 2013 to 2014, Gulati appeared as a panellist on the lunchtime talk show Loose Women.

Early life

Gulati was born in Oldham, Lancashire, to Hindu Indian parents. She grew up in the Salcombe area of Openshaw, Manchester, where she became friends with actress Sarah Lancashire. She has a degree in Arabic and Middle Eastern politics from the University of Manchester.

Career
One of Gulati's earliest appearances was as a dancer in the video for Boy George's 1991 single "Bow Down Mister". In the late 1990s, she appeared in both series of Victoria Wood's BBC sitcom dinnerladies. She appeared as Ameena Badawi from October to December 2000 in EastEnders. She appeared in Coronation Street as Sunita and in the same role in "East Street", a crossover between both soaps, as part of the 2010 Children In Need telethon. In 2001, she appeared in the short film Shadowscan, directed by Tinge Krishnan, which won a Bafta Award and, in 2004, was nominated for a Manchester Evening News theatre award for her work in the play Dancing Within Walls, which was staged at the Contact Theatre in Manchester.

Gulati has also appeared on the TV quiz shows Call My Bluff, Have I Got News for You, The Weakest Link, Russian Roulette and as Diana Ross in Celebrity Stars in Their Eyes. In early 2006, Gulati took part in the Reality TV series Soapstar Superstar.

After Gulati left Coronation Street for the first time in 2006, she played Nisha Clayton, a regular role in the final series of Where the Heart Is, and made appearances in New Street Law and the one-off comedy drama Magnolia, which was written by Dave Spikey for BBC's Comedy Playhouse series.

In October 2006, Gulati appeared at the Royal Albert Hall as part of a short skit featured in The Secret Policeman's Ball. In the sketch, Gulati and her co-star Nitin Ganatra play a holidaying couple who are under the mistaken belief Guantanamo Bay is a holiday resort. The sketch also starred the American actors Chevy Chase and Seth Green.

Gulati was one of the storytellers in a CBBC revival of Jackanory and in the UK tour of the hit play Girls Night by Louise Roche. She also appeared on the Channel 4 special Empire's Children, tracing her family's history during the partition of India. In summer 2007, she appeared in Pretend You Have Big Buildings at the Royal Exchange, Manchester.

In 2008, Gulati made her debut as a filmmaker, producing the short film Akshay for the motiroti's 60x60 Secs. This was shortlisted for the Satyajit Ray short film awards. During this same period, she returned to her Coronation Street role as Sunita Alahan, where she stayed for three years.

On 11 June 2009, Gulati appeared in the BBC1 programme Celebrity MasterChef. She did the first stage tour of dinnerladies in early 2009 and she has appeared as a guest story teller for Bedtime Stories on CBBC. Gulati made her Loose Women debut on 18 November 2010 to celebrate 50 years of Coronation Street, appearing with regulars Kate Thornton, Sherrie Hewson and Carol McGiffin. Gulati returned to the show on 11 April 2012 appearing alongside regulars Andrea McLean, Jane McDonald and Janet Street-Porter during soap week. Gulati returned to the show as a regular from 13 March 2013, taking over from Sally Lindsay who took time off to film Mount Pleasant, from September 2013, Gulati became an occasional panellist on the show, before leaving on 30 May 2014.

In June 2011, Gulati was a guest on Countdown. Announcing her departure from Coronation Street, she expressed her desire to write and perform more comedy than her work in a soap opera had permitted her time to do. In 2016, she appeared in the ITV/Netflix series Paranoid. Gulati made a guest appearance in Casualty on 29 October 2016.

In 2017, she appeared as Saba in the British romantic comedy film Finding Fatimah. 
In 2018, Gulati appeared in the Doctor Who episodes "Arachnids in the UK" and "Demons of the Punjab" as Najia Khan, mother of The Doctor's companion Yasmin Khan.

She played Ray in the West End production of Everybody's Talking About Jamie at the Apollo Theatre in 2018. Now adapted as a screenplay, Gulati plays the part of Ray alongside Sarah Lancashire. Everybody's Talking About Jamie which was released on 17 September 2021. In May 2021, Gulati starred as "Vicky" in the three-part comedy drama murder mystery series, Murder, They Hope.

Gulati wrote a memoir on losing a parent to dementia based on her experiences caring for her mother, who died in 2019. During publicity interviews for the book, Gulati revealed that she had contracted Coronavirus earlier in 2020.

Personal life
Gulati is the daughter of K.A. Gulati who arrived in Oldham from Bombay, India, in 1960. She has a younger brother, Rajesh, and two older sisters, Sushma and Hema.

Gulati married the architect Anshu Srivastava in a Hindu ceremony on 10 November 1990; the couple divorced in May 1994. Shobna lived separately from her husband and became pregnant. From 1999 to 2003, Shobna was in a relationship with the ex-Emmerdale actor Gary Turner.

Gulati has a working knowledge of six languages and is a vocal supporter of Asian women's rights and various anti-racism campaigns. Shobna works on female body image issues. Shobna is a supporter and a season ticket holder of Manchester United.

In 2015, Shobna was appointed as a deputy lieutenant of Greater Manchester. This gives her the right to use the Post Nominal Letters "DL" for life.

Shafilea Ahmed
Gulati was called in to join a murder hunt in December 2004 following the murder of Shafilea Ahmed. At a press conference appealing for more information about the teenager's death, Gulati read out some of the poems found in her bedroom by police during their investigations which "were a testimony to her sadness at being caught in a culture clash with other members of her family". After the reading, Gulati said that she believed they showed that Shafilea was trapped between two cultures. "It can be very difficult if you are born here but your parents were not and there can be a lot of cultural issues," she said. "It is a situation facing many young Asian women who are unable to express themselves properly within their families. I feel these words are the sort of style she would use when talking with her friends. If she is out there she should let people know she is safe because there are organisations and individuals who can help her."

Gulati went on to say that she sympathised with the teenager's difficulty in balancing her culture with her upbringing. "She has obviously been unable to express herself in terms of her family and she probably talks like this to her friends, or has written these songs in private."

Filmography

Honours

Commonwealth honours
 Commonwealth honours

Scholastic
 University degrees

Honorary degrees

References

External links
 

British Hindus
British female dancers
English soap opera actresses
English television actresses
Alumni of the University of Manchester
Actresses from Oldham
1966 births
Living people
English people of Indian descent
British actresses of Indian descent
Deputy Lieutenants of Greater Manchester